Schizodus is an extinct genus of shallow marine clams.  It lived from the Silurian to Early Jurassic periods.

Schizodus is the exemplar of schizodonts, clams having reverse V-shaped scissurate hinge teeth, and often an elongated lateral tooth.

References

External links
 
 

Bivalves described in 1844
Trigoniida
Prehistoric bivalve genera